Niels Duffhuës (born 8 January 1973 in Oss) is a Dutch multi-instrumentalist, composer and writer. From 1993 to 1994 he was the vocalist and acoustic guitarist in the then Doom metal band The Gathering, and he played on their album Almost a Dance, released in 1993. From 1997 to 1998, he played drums in U-Charger. In 1998 he founded the experimental rock band Enos, and he recorded the album Tremolo with them, before they split in 2001. From 2000 to 2002 he was also a member of Blimey!. After that he started a solo career, and he released several albums. He released The Village in 2018.

Discography
The Gathering - Almost a Dance (1993)
Enos - Tremolo (2000)

Solo albums
Piranesi's Rome (2001)
Jacky the Stripper (2002)
Harem (2005)
Man on Fire (2007)
Songs of Mystery (2009)
Among the Ruins (2011)
There's a Storm coming (2014)
The Village (2018)

External links
Official website
The Gathering official website

1973 births
Living people
Dutch heavy metal singers
Dutch multi-instrumentalists
People from Oss
21st-century Dutch male singers
21st-century Dutch singers